Michael Todd (born 1935) is an American artist, based in Southern California since 1968.   His work is included in numerous public and private collections, including the Metropolitan Museum of Art.  He is the father of musician Mia Doi Todd.

Awards
Woodrow Wilson Fellowship 
Fulbright Fellowship

Exhibitions
Pace Gallery, 1964 
Primary Structures, 1966
American Sculpture of the Sixties, Los Angeles County Museum of Art, 1967

Notes

Further reading

External links
 http://michaeltoddsculpture.com/
 

1935 births
American artists
Living people